Velikovo is a rural locality (a village) in Kupriyanovskoye Rural Settlement, Gorokhovetsky District, Vladimir Oblast, Russia. The population was 618 as of 2010. There are 34 streets.

Geography 
Velikovo is located 12 km southeast of Gorokhovets (the district's administrative centre) by road. Semyonovka is the nearest rural locality.

References 

Rural localities in Gorokhovetsky District